Elliott H. Margulies is director of scientific research at Illumina Cambridge.  He was previously an investigator at the National Human Genome Research Institute (NHGRI) focusing on the use of high-throughput DNA sequencing technologies to elucidate basic genome biology and important clinical problems.

Awards
Dr. Margulies was awarded a Presidential Early Career Award for Scientists and Engineers in 2007.

References

American geneticists
Living people
Year of birth missing (living people)
Rutgers University alumni
University of Michigan alumni